Oak Ridge Apartments is a historic apartment building at 1615-1625 Ridge Avenue in Evanston, Illinois. The three-story brick building was built in 1914. Architect Andrew Sandegren, who also designed several Chicago apartment buildings, designed the building in the Tudor Revival style; Sandegren would go on to live in the building. The building features projecting entrance bays, an open central courtyard, and a crenellated roofline with projecting gables. Each apartment included amenities meant to cater to upper-class residents, such as servants' quarters, sunrooms, and brick fireplaces.

The building was added to the National Register of Historic Places on March 15, 1984.

References

Buildings and structures on the National Register of Historic Places in Cook County, Illinois
Residential buildings on the National Register of Historic Places in Illinois
Buildings and structures in Evanston, Illinois
Apartment buildings in Illinois
Tudor Revival architecture in Illinois
Residential buildings completed in 1914